Nighttime Stories is the sixth studio album by American post-metal band Pelican. The album was released on June 7, 2019 through Southern Lord Records. In April 2019, Pelican released the song "Midnight and Mescaline" as a digital and 7-inch single.

Critical reception

Nighttime Stories was met with critical acclaim. The album received an average score of 82/100 from 8 reviews on Metacritic, indicating "universal acclaim".

Track listing

Personnel 
Credits adapted from Nighttime Stories liner notes

Pelican
 Trevor de Brauw – guitar
 Bryan Herweg – bass
 Larry Herweg – drums
 Dallas Thomas – guitar

Additional personnel
 Aaron Turner – artwork and layout
 Andrew Weiss – photography
 Ed Brooks – mastering
 Matt Bayles – mixing
 Sanford Parker – recording

References

External links 
Nighttime Stories on Bandcamp

2019 albums
Pelican (band) albums